Matar Sène (born September 16, 1970 in Dakar) is a retired amateur Senegalese freestyle wrestler, who competed in the men's light heavyweight category. He picked up a silver medal in the 74-kg division at the 2003 All-Africa Games in Abuja, Nigeria, and also represented his nation Senegal at the 2004 Summer Olympics. Throughout his sporting career, Sene trained full-time for Ecurie Fass Wrestling Club in his native Dakar under his personal coach Lansana Coly.

Sene qualified for the Senegalese squad, as a 34-year-old veteran and a lone wrestler, in the men's 84 kg class at the 2004 Summer Olympics in Athens. He filled up an entry by the International Federation of Association Wrestling (FILA) through a tripartite invitation and an Olympic Solidarity program. Sene lost all three matches each to eventual Olympic bronze medalist Sazhid Sazhidov of Russia by a rare 17–0 thrashing, Tajikistan's Shamil Aliev (3–6), and four-time Olympic veteran Nicolae Ghiţă of Romania (3–11), leaving him on the bottom of the pool and placing seventeenth in the final standings.

References

External links
Profile – International Wrestling Database

1970 births
Living people
Olympic wrestlers of Senegal
Wrestlers at the 2004 Summer Olympics
Sportspeople from Dakar
Senegalese male sport wrestlers
African Games silver medalists for Senegal
African Games medalists in wrestling
Competitors at the 2003 All-Africa Games